Grassy Creek is an unincorporated community in the Grassy Creek Township of Ashe County, North Carolina, United States, near the border with the state of Virginia.

History
Grassy Creek was established around 1788 .

The Grassy Creek Historic District and William Waddell House were listed on the National Register of Historic Places in 2007.

Demographics
Grassy Creek's Zip Code Tabulation Area (Zip Code 27507) has a population of 511 as of the 2000 census.  The population is 53.4% male and 46.6% female.  About 92.2% of the population is white, 1.2% African-American, 0.6% American Indian, 7.8% Hispanic, 5.3% some other race and 0.8% of people are two or more races.

The median household income is $28,654 with 21.8% of the population living below the poverty line.

See also
 Grassy Creek

References

Unincorporated communities in Ashe County, North Carolina
Unincorporated communities in North Carolina
Populated places established in 1788
1788 establishments in North Carolina

memoirs of grassy creek